Maple Street Historic District can refer to:

 Maple Street Historic District (Southbridge, Massachusetts)
 Maple Street Historic District (Addison, New York)
 Maple Street Historic District (Battle Creek, Michigan)
 Maple Street Historic District (Lewisburg, West Virginia)

See also
Maple Avenue Historic District (disambiguation)